This is a list of Sonar sailboat championships.

Open Worlds Championships

Disabled World Championships
The Sonar has also been used extensively for disabled sailing. The boat specifications are exactly the same for open and disabled sailing events, but additional adaptations are allowed to be fitted to the boat to aid the crew who are not permitted to hike or use a spinnaker. The World Championships is recognised by World Sailing.

Paralympics
The Sonar has been the equipment used for the three person keelboat discipline at all Paralympic Sailing Competitions that have included sailing.

References

Sonar (keelboat)